Kathbirali is a 2019 Bangladeshi romantic drama film. The film story and directed by Niamul Hasan Mukta and produced by Chilekotha Films. It feature Asaduzzaman Abir and Orchita Sporshia in the lead roles and Sayed Zaman Shawon, Shilpi Sarkar Apu, AK Azad Setu, Shahriar Ferdous Sajib, Hindol Roy, TAnvir Ahmed Anontow, Tanjina Rahman Tasnim played supporting roles in the film. The film was released on January 17, 2020.

Cast 
 Asaduzzaman Abir as Hashu
 Orchita Sporshia as Kajal
 Shilpi Sarkar Apu as Kajal's mother
 Hindol Roy as Asgor's father
 AK Azad Setu as Police
 Tanjina Rahman Tasnim as Anis's wife Bilkis

Soundtrack 

The soundtrack album of the film composed by Yousuf Hasan Ark and Emon Chowdhury.

Release 
The film was first released in 1 theater on December 27, 2019. And on January 17, 2020 the film released nationwide in 18 theaters.

References

External links 

2019 films
2019 romantic drama films
Bengali-language Bangladeshi films
Bangladeshi romantic drama films
2010s Bengali-language films
Films shot in Pabna